The 1984–85 UC Irvine Anteaters men's basketball team represented the University of California, Irvine during the 1984–85 NCAA Division I men's basketball season. The Anteaters were led by fifth year head coach Bill Mulligan and played their home games at the Crawford Hall. They were members of the Pacific Coast Athletic Association. They finished the season 13–17 and 8–10 in PCAA play.

Previous season 
The 1983–84 UC Irvine Anteaters men's basketball team returned finished with a record of 19–10 and 14–4 in PCAA play. Senior Forward Ben McDonald received AP Honorable Mention All-American Honors.

Roster

Schedule

|-
!colspan=9 style=|Non-Conference Season

|-
!colspan=9 style=|Conference Season

|-
!colspan=9 style=| PCAA tournament

Source

Awards and honors
Tod Murphy
AP Honorable Mention All-American
PCAA First Team All-Conference
Johnny Rogers
PCAA Second Team All-Conference
Wayne Engelstad
PCAA All-Freshman Team
Source:

References

UC Irvine Anteaters men's basketball seasons
Uc Irvine
UC Irvine Anteaters
UC Irvine Anteaters